Luke J Pen (1960–2002) was a biologist and environmental scientist in Western Australia.

He researched and wrote about rivers and their biology and management, in the south west of Western Australia.

A memorial walk path on the Kalgan River commemorates his efforts and work to raise interest and knowledge in local rivers.

In 2008 a memorial scholarship in his name was created to support students of riverine environments in their research.

Notes

1960 births
2002 deaths
Australian biologists
People from Perth, Western Australia
Scientists from Western Australia
20th-century biologists